The Gladenbach Uplands, named after their central town of Gladenbach, is a range of hills up to 609 m high in the Rhine Massif in Germany, on the junction of the Rothaar Mountains (north and northwest), Westerwald (southwest), (Eastern) Hintertaunus (in the south) and West Hesse Highlands in the east.
It lies in Central Hesse within the districts of Marburg-Biedenkopf, Lahn-Dill and Gießen within the so-called Lahn-Dill-(Dietzhölze-) loop. Small parts of the Upper Lahn Valley in the northwest  belong, together with the town of Bad Laasphe, also to the district of Siegen-Wittgenstein, North Rhine-Westphalia.

The Gladenbach Uplands are geographical unit 320 which is part of the natural region 32, the Westerwald, in Germany's system of natural regions. The Gladenbach Highlands is largely coextensive with the Lahn-Dill Uplands Nature Park which extends further west, however, but is somewhat less extensive in the southeast and whose boundaries tend to line up with those of the sponsoring municipalities. In addition, not insignificant areas belong to the historical Hessian Hinterland, which is why the two named articles refer to one another, as far as regional associations, culture and history are concerned. Geology and mining will be largely covered in the article on the Lahn-Dill Region

Geography

Location and boundaries 

On the rivers Lahn and Dill the following towns - clockwise from the north -  border the Gladenbach Uplands:
 Bad Laasphe (northwest)
 Biedenkopf (north)
 Western suburbs of Marburg (northeast)
 Lollar (southeast)
 Gießen (southeast)
 Wetzlar (south)
 Herborn (southwest)
 Dillenburg (west)

The northwest transitions to the Rothaar Mountains are comparatively fluid. Here the watershed between the Lahn tributaries of the Banfe and Perf define the boundary.

Rivers and streams 

The natural regions mentioned above are generally divided between the catchment areas of the der Lahn and Dill tributaries and the landscapes separated by these rivers.

The most important watercourses, in addition to the boundary rivers of the Lahn, Dill and Dietzhölze – are the Aar, the Salzböde, the Perf and Allna.

The following rivers and streams are sorted in clockwise order i.e. down the Lahn and up the Dill, beginning with the upper reaches of the Lahn in the north and cover a catchment area of over 20 km²:(the natural regions are linked in the column of their most important river!)

→ to full list

The outer boundary of the Gladenbach Uplands is formed by the Lahn and Dill accompanied in the north (upper reaches of the Lahn) by the B 62, in the east by the B 3 Marburg-Gießen (mostly autobahn-like, clearly external in the Marburg area), in the east, south of the B 49 Gießen-Wetzlar (mostly autobahn-like) and in the southwest (lower reaches of the Dill) by the A 45. The Bundesstraße 253 Dillenburg-Biedenkopf (see above) roughly closes the remaining gap.

Waterbodies 
The most important reservoir in the Gladenbach Uplands is the Aartalsee (57 ha, 270 m above NN) in the Niederweidbach Basin, followed by the Perf Reservoir (18 ha, 301 m) in the Breidenbach Bottom (Breidenbach Bottom).

Hills 
The hills of the Gladenbach Uplands, arranged by ridge or natural region, include the following: (Location of the natural regions with the Gladenbach Uplands and location of the hills within the natural region)

Bottenhorn Plateaux - northwest of the centre
 Angelburg (609 m) - west of the centre; occasionally counted as part of the Schelde Forest
 Schmittgrund (590 m) - southern spur of the Angelburg, occasionally counted as part of the Schelde Forest
 Mattenberg (578 m) - north west
 Kurzbeul (566 m) - extreme west
 Würgeloh (563,9 m) north Hartenrod / Bad Endbach
 Madche (560 m) - northwest
 Daubhaus (551,8 m) - extreme east, north of Rachelshausen
 Allberg (528 m) - northeast of the Daubhaus
 Hünstein (504 m) - north of the Allberg; not really an independent summit, but has an observation tower; gives its name to Holzhausen am Hünstein
 Bolzeberg (520 m) - extreme northeast
 Steffenberg (489 m) - extreme (west) north, gives its name to the municipality of Steffenberg
 Schelde Forest (in the narrow sense) - west
 Eschenburg (590 m NN) - north, above the Dietzhölze Valley (which lies to the northwest)
 Hohe Koppe (540.2 m) - northeast
 Stockseite (516 m) - east
 Breidenbach Bottom - extreme north(west)
 Hemmerichskopf (562 m) - western boundary with the Rothaar Mountains
 Schwarzenberg (561 m) - northeast; centre eines großen zusammenhängendes Waldgebiet southwest of Biedenkopf and east of Breidenbach
 Hachenberg (552 m) - northern subpeak
 Nimerich (533 m) - southeastern subpeak; highest point in the municipality of Dautphetal
 Schadenberg (545 m) - southwest of the centre
 Galgenberg (541 m) - extreme southwest
 Entenberg (535 m) - northwestern boundary zum Rothaar Mountains
 Zollbuche - centre
 Hirschhohl (503 m) - northwest boundary with the plateaux
 Schönscheid (498 m) - west, northwest Günterod
 Bad Endbacher Platte (up to 488 m) - centre
 Hemmerich (475.7 m) - east; forms with Koppe and Dreisberg the eastern trio of hills of the Gladenbach Uplands
 Koppe (454 m) - with observation tower; near Gladenbach-Erdhausen
 Dreisberg (448 m)
 Damshäuser Kuppen - northeast
 Rimberg (498 m) - east north; with observation tower
 Kappe (494 m) - west north
 Schweinskopf (472 m) - north west, near Dautphetal-Herzhausen
 Eichelhardt (465 m) - northwest
 Dusenberg (457 m) - extreme west, near Dautphetal-Herzhausen
 Hornberg (451 m) - extreme northwest
 Hungert (412 m) - extreme northeast; pyramidal Kuppe on the boundary with the  Marburg Ridge
 Auersberg (385 m) - east, between Elnhausen, Nesselbrunn and Dilschhausen
 Donnerberg (370 m) - southeast, northeast of Gladenbach
 Krofdorf-Königsberg Forest - south and southeast
 Dünsberg (498 m) - east centre; volcanic singularity with Celtic excavation sites, TV transmission tower and observation tower
 Altenberg (442 m) - northwest centre, observation tower
 Ramsberg (ca. 435 m) - north; Hohensolms Castle
 Forst Krofdorf (up to 357 m) - east; large contiguous forest region that links the Dünsberg to the east with the Lahn Valley
 Königsstuhl (348 m) - south; one of the southernmost hills of the Gladenbach Uplands
 Hörre - southwest
 Alteburg (445 m) - in the centre
 Roßberg (392 m) - northeast, south of Bischoffen
 Koppe (354 m) - south, west of Kölschhausen
 Niederweidbach Basin - south of the centre
 Bergwald (im east up to 392 m) - east of the centre
 Salzböde Valley - northeast, east and southeast of the centre
 Kirchberg (362 m) - north, east of Gladenbach
 Lammerich (357 m) - north, southwest of Gladenbach

References

Literature 
 Meynen, Emil (ed.): Handbuch der naturräumlichen Gliederung Deutschlands. Selbstverlag der Bundesanstalt für Landeskunde, Remagen, 1953-1962 (Part 1, contains issues 1-5), ISBN B0000BJ19E
 Meynen, Emil (ed.): Handbuch der naturräumlichen Gliederung Deutschlands. Selbstverlag der Bundesanstalt für Landeskunde, Remagen, 1959-1962 (Part 2, contains issues 6-9), ISBN B0000BJ19F

External links 
  of the Gladenbach Uplands / Placemarks Download (Google Earth required)
 BfN
 Map services
 Landscape fact files
 Lahn-Dill Uplands
 Gladenbach Hills and Upper Lahn Valley

Central Uplands
Hill ranges of Germany
Regions of Hesse
Rhenish Massif